Comitas nana is an extinct species of sea snail, a marine gastropod mollusc in the family Pseudomelatomidae.

Distribution
This extinct species is endemic to New Zealand.

References

 Maxwell, Phillip A. Late Miocene deep-water Mollusca from the Stillwater Mudstone at Greymouth, westland, New Zealand: paleoecology and systematics. No. 55. New Zealand Geological Survey, 1988.
 Maxwell, P.A. (2009). Cenozoic Mollusca. Pp 232-254 in Gordon, D.P. (ed.) New Zealand inventory of biodiversity. Volume one. Kingdom Animalia: Radiata, Lophotrochozoa, Deuterostomia. Canterbury University Press, Christchurch.

nana
Gastropods described in 1988
Gastropods of New Zealand